Fidler Afn Dakh (פידלער אויפן דאך) is a Yiddish-language adaptation of the musical Fiddler on the Roof translated and adapted by Shraga Friedman. The adaptation revisits the 1894 collection of Yiddish short stories on which Fiddler on the Roof is based, about Tevye the Dairyman. Friedman created the translation for a 1965 Israeli production. It was produced by the National Yiddish Theatre Folksbiene (NYTF) in New York City in 2018 and transferred off-Broadway to Stage 42 in 2019.

Productions

Original Production (Israel) 
The Yiddish translated production was first performed in 1965.

North American Premiere 
The first North American production was produced by the NYTF at the Museum of Jewish Heritage in New York City, directed by Joel Grey, featuring musical staging and choreography by Staś Kmieć in the style of the original. Motl Didner and Sabina Brukner served as Yiddish coaches. The cast included Steven Skybell (as Tevye), Jennifer Babiak (as Golde), Rachel Zatcoff (as Tsaytl), Stephanie Lynne Mason (as Hodl), Rosie Jo Neddy (as Khave), Jackie Hoffman (as Yente), Ben Liebert (as Motl), Daniel Kahn (as Pertshik), Cameron Johnson (as Fyedka), Bruce Sabath (as Lazar-Volf), Mary Illes (as Bubbe Tsaytl), Jodi Snyder (as Fruma-Sore), Joanne Borts (as Sheyndl), Josh Dunn (as Chaim), Kirk Geritano (as Avram), Michael Yashinsky (as Mordcha), Samantha Hahn (as Bielke), Evan Mayer (as Sasha), Raquel Nobile (as Shprintze), Nick Raynor (as Yosl), Adam B. Shapiro (as Der Rov), James Monroe Števko (as Mendl), Lauren Jeanne Thomas (as Der Fidler), Michael Einav (As Ensemble and Understudy to Motl, Pertshik and Fyedka), and Bobby Underwood (as Der Godoroy).

The production was accompanied by English and Russian supertitles.

The first preview was on July 4, 2018. Opening night was July 15, 2018. The show was scheduled to run for 6 weeks until August 26, 2018, but it was extended three times, through the end of 2018, until it was transferred uptown to a commercial Off-Broadway theatre. (See below)

Off Broadway Commercial Premiere 
After 4 successful extensions, the Folksbiene's production was converted to a commercial run and transferred to Stage 42 by producers Hal Luftig and Jana Robbins in February 2019. The production featured new musical staging and  choreography by Staś Kmieć  set design by Beowulf Boritt, costumes by Ann Hould-Ward, sound by Dan Moses Schreier and lighting by Peter Kaczorowski. The production continued to be accompanied by English and Russian supertitles.

A cast recording was released digitally on August 9, 2019 and was released physically on August 23 that same year. The production was announced to close January 5, 2020.

Other Productions 
In August 2019 it was announced that the production would have its Australian premiere, to be staged by Opera Australia and the Gordon Frost Organisation. The Australian production will open at the Sydney Opera House in September 2020, followed by a run in Melbourne at the Comedy Theatre in November. Unfortunately the COVID-19 pandemic resulted in the cancellation of the production.

Off-Broadway 2022 Revival 
On July 25, 2022, the NYTF announced a revival of the production featuring Steven Skybell returning as Tevye and Joel Grey as director. It is planned to run from November 13, 2022 through January 1, 2023 at New World Stages.

Awards

The production won the 2019 Drama Desk Award for Outstanding Revival of a Musical, the Outer Critics Circle Award for Outstanding Revival of a Musical, and the New York Critics Circle citation for Best Revival of a Musical.

References

Jewish theatre
Fiddler on the Roof
Yiddish theatre